Takis Fyssas (born 12 June 1973) is a Greek former professional footballer who played as a left back. He works as the sporting director of the Greece national team. He was previously the technical director of the Panathinaikos Youth Departments.

From 1999 to 2007, he earned 60 caps for the Greece national team. He was part of the team which won Euro 2004.

Club career

Panionios
Fyssas started his career in the Panionios youth academy, achieving his senior debut in the 1990–91 season. After eight seasons in Nea Smyrni, which included a Greek Cup triumph.

Panathinaikos
He signed for Athens club Panathinaikos in 1998. The increased exposure Fyssas received playing at the Spiros Louis ensured a rapid elevation to the Greece national side and he made his debut against Finland in 1999. Fyssas also made his first UEFA Champions League appearance while with the Greens, in the 2000–01 season.

Benfica
In December 2003, he moved to Lisbon with Benfica, where he was to stay for a season and a half, helping Benfica claim the 2003–04 Portuguese Cup and 2004–05 Primeira Liga. On 25 January 2004, he was on the bench for a 1–0 away win against Vitória de Guimarães, a game overshadowed by the sudden death of his teammate Miklós Fehér. He scored a goal on the final of Portuguese Cup that season, that gave them the victory against FC Porto.

Hearts
After being allowed to leave Benfica in the summer of 2005, Fyssas made the surprise decision to move to Scotland with the Hearts, despite reported interest from England and Germany. He collected his fourth career winners medal in his first season with the Tynecastle side, when they defeated Gretna in the 2005–06 Scottish Cup final. His first and only Hearts goal came in a league game against Motherwell on 9 December 2006. He became a popular member of the Hearts team and will always be remembered fondly for his celebrations after clinching a place in the UEFA Champions League. He left the Edinburgh club at the end of the 2006–07 season to move back to Panathinaikos.

Panathinaikos
In his second Panathinaikos term, he played just a couple of games and he silently decided to retire from football.

International career
Fyssas played 60 matches for Greece national team and he scored four goals. He was one of the key players for team that won the Euro 2004 championship in Portugal, a win that shocked the footballing world as Greece were considered 100–1 outsiders before the tournament started. He was subsequently selected in the Team of the Tournament.

After retirement
Fyssas after his retirement entered into the staff of the Greece national team, helping Otto Rehhagel for the 2010 FIFA World Cup and the new coach Fernando Santos after Rehhagel retired in 2010.

In May 2019 Fyssas, was nominated as a candidate for Greece's New Democracy Party, and started his career in politics.

Career statistics

Club

International goals
Scores and results list Greece's goal tally first, score column indicates score after each Fyssas goal.

Honours
Panionios
 Greek Cup: 1997–98

Panathinaikos
 Greek Cup: runners–up 1998–99

Benfica
 Primeira Liga: 2004–05
 Taça de Portugal: 2003–04
 Supertaça Cândido de Oliveira: runner-up 2004

Hearts
 Scottish Cup: 2006

Greece
 UEFA European Championship: 2004

References

External links
Profile at londonhearts.com

1973 births
Living people
Footballers from Athens
Greek footballers
Greek expatriate footballers
S.L. Benfica footballers
Heart of Midlothian F.C. players
Panathinaikos F.C. players
UEFA Euro 2004 players
UEFA European Championship-winning players
2005 FIFA Confederations Cup players
Greece international footballers
Panionios F.C. players
Scottish Premier League players
Super League Greece players
Football League (Greece) players
Primeira Liga players
Expatriate footballers in Scotland
Expatriate footballers in Portugal
Greek expatriate sportspeople in Portugal
Association football defenders
Panathinaikos F.C. non-playing staff
Greek expatriate sportspeople in Scotland